Khary Randolph (born January 10, 1979, in Boston, Massachusetts) is an American comic book artist. He has worked on such series as Starborn, Charismagic, Tech Jacket, Mosaic, and Excellence; and for such publishers as Marvel Comics, Epic Comics, DC Comics, Aspen Comics, Image Comics, and Boom! Studios.

Biography 
Born in Boston, Randolph grew up in Brooklyn, New York.

In an interview with Bleeding Cool, Randolph discussed his influences growing up:

Randolph graduated from the School of Visual Arts in 2000 with a BFA in Cartooning & Illustration.

His first published comic work was Spider-Man: Legend of the Spider-Clan #5, published by Marvel in 2003.

He was a guest at the 2006 edition of the Big Apple Comic Con's National Comic Book, Art, Toy & Sci-Fi Expo.
 
Randolph illustrated cards in the Chaotic Trading Card Game, released in 2007.

Randolph worked on We Are Robin, which launched in June 2015, with writer Lee Bermejo and artist Rob Haynes, which detailed multiple teenagers in Gotham City who take up the mantle of Robin.

From 2013 to 2015 he created covers for DC Comics' Batman Beyond Universe. In 2016, Randolph created covers for Black Mask Studios' Black.

In 2019, he and writer Brandon Thomas launched the creator-owned series Excellence with Image Comics/Skybound Entertainment. Excellence, created entirely by people of color, is about a secret society of black magicians.

Art style 
Randolph is known for his dynamic art style which shows influence from manga and hip hop.

Awards 
 2017 Glyph Comics Award for "Best Cover" for Black No. 1
 2019 Glyph Comics Awards:
 "Best Artist"
 "Best Cover" for Noble, Vol 2: Never Events

Exhibitions 
 2019 "Black / Excellence: The Art of Khary Randolph," New York City College of Technology Communication Design Center (Brooklyn, New York)

Bibliography (selected)

Comics 
 Amazing Fantasy #15: "Monstro" (with Robert Kirkman, Marvel, 2006)
 Batman Black and White No. 6 (with Brandon Thomas, DC Comics, May 2021)
 Charismagic #1–6 (with Vince Hernandez, Aspen Comics, 2011–2012)
 Deadpool: The Gauntlet No. 9, "Gangs of New York" (with Gerry Duggan and Brian Posehn, Marvel Comics, 2014)
 Epic Anthology: "Sleepwalker: New Beginnings" (with Robert Kirkman, Epic Comics, 2004)
 Excellence (with Brandon Thomas, Image Comics/Skybound Entertainment, 2019)
 Marvel NOW! 2.0: Mosaic #1–8 (with Geoffrey Thorne, Marvel Comics, October 2016–May 2017)
 Peter Parker: Spider-Man No. 55 (with Zeb Wells and Wayne Faucher, Marvel, June 2003)
 Robin War #1–2 (with Tom King, DC Comics, 2016)
 Spawn No. 198 (with Todd McFarlane, Image Comics, July 2010)
 Spider-Man: Legend of the Spider-Clan #5 (with Kaare Andrews and Skottie Young, Marvel Comics, April 2003)
 Starborn #1–9, 11–12 (with Chris Roberson and Matteo Scalera, Boom! Studios, 2010-2012)
 Tech Jacket #1–12 (with Joe Keatinge, Image, 2014–2015)
 Teen Titans Go! No. 22 (with J. Torres, DC Comics, October 2005)
 We Are... Robin No. 1 (with Lee Bermejo, DC Comics, Aug. 2015)

References

External links
 "Comic Book Artist Khary Randolph on His Unique Style," SYFY WIRE (February 9, 2017)
 "Khary Randolph on Being A Black Comic Book Artist," SYFY WIRE (February 9, 2017)
 
 

Living people
Artists from Boston
Artists from Brooklyn
School of Visual Arts alumni
African-American comics creators
People from Brooklyn
1979 births
21st-century African-American people
20th-century African-American people